Gunahar union is a union of Dupchanchia Upazila of Bogra district of Rajshahi division of Bangladesh. This union's geographic contact code (geocode) is 50.10.33.54. The current chairman of the union Noor Mohammad. It was also the headquarters of the erstwhile Zamindars of Gunahar.

History 
The union was formed in 1976. Zamindar Khan Bahadur Motahar Husayn Khan, who belonged the Khan family of Gunahar, established the high school and haat in Taluch with the name of his first son Omar Haydar Khan. His second son, Zubayr Hayat Khan, established the Gunahar Union Council Complex building and Gunahar Post Office and his nephew, Abdur Rashid Khan (Ali Khan), served as a lifelong chairman of the Gunahar Union Council and founded the Gunahar Primary School.

Geography 
The total area of this union is 18.09 km2, located between Dupchanchia Upazila Sadar.

Administrative area 
Gunnar union consists of a mouza / village. The mouza is divided into 9 administrative wards.

The villages are:

 Ward no. 1 – Atoil, Koigari, Jaroi, Boro Nilahaali, Beragram, Sorom. 
 Ward no. 2 – Chhatny, Taluch, Pachusha 
 Ward no. 3 – Chandimandap, Chhoto Karamji, Jhajira, Dangapara, Raghubarshipur. 
 Ward no. 4 – Amjhupy, Gunahara, Palokuri, Bhanduriya. 
 Ward no. 5 – Singa, Kamaru, Kazigari, Belhotti, Pukuragacha . 
 Ward no. 6 – Arjunagari, Kurahar, keot, Choto Barram, Suhali. 
 Ward no. 7 – Unahat, Bhatahar, Singra, Surzata 
 Ward no. 8 – Khagra, Damkuri, Pouta, Merai. 
 Ward no. 9 – Paogacha, Dochia, Bhathanda, Nurpur.
Each ward has an elected representative (council member). Again, there are elected women representatives (female members of the council) in every three wards. They are reporting the elected representatives (chairman of the council). The council also has one recruited secretary, ten village police and one entrepreneur.

Population 
According to the 2011 census, the total population of Gunner union was 30,586.

Education  
The average literacy rate of Gunahar union is 50.0%. Among them, the rate of female literacy is 45.6% and the male literacy rate is 54.8%. Among the important educational institutions in this area.

Economics 
The economy of Gunahar Union is largely dependent on agriculture.

References 

Bogura District